Gerard Egelmeers is a Dutch former Olympic rower. He represented his country in the men's single sculls at the 2000 Summer Olympics. His time was a 7:05.48/7:04.25 in the qualifiers/repechage, a 7:07.14 in the semifinals, and a 6:55.29 in the finals.

References

Living people
1969 births
Dutch male rowers
Olympic rowers of the Netherlands
Rowers at the 2000 Summer Olympics